The history of science and technology in Mexico spans many years. 

Indigenous Mesoamerican civilizations developed mathematics, astronomy, and calendrics, and solved technological problems of water management for agriculture and flood control in Central Mexico. 

Following the Spanish conquest in 1521, New Spain (colonial Mexico) was brought into the European sphere of science and technology. The Royal and Pontifical University of Mexico, established in 1551, was a hub of intellectual and religious development in colonial Mexico for over a century. During the Spanish American Enlightenment in Mexico, the colony made considerable progress in science, but following the war of independence and political instability in the early nineteenth century, progress stalled.  

During the late 19th century under the regime of Porfirio Díaz, the process of industrialization began in Mexico. Following the Mexican Revolution, a ten-year civil war, Mexico made significant progress in science and technology. During the 20th century, new universities, such as the National Polytechnical Institute, Monterrey Institute of Technology and research institutes, such as those at the National Autonomous University of Mexico, were established in Mexico.

According to the World Bank, Mexico is Latin America's largest exporter of high-technology goods (High-technology exports are manufactured goods that involve high R&D intensity, such as in aerospace, computers, pharmaceuticals, scientific instruments, and electrical machinery) with $40.7 billion worth of high-technology goods exports in 2012. Mexican high-technology exports accounted for 17% of all manufactured goods in the country in 2012 according to the World Bank.

Indigenous Civilizations

The Olmec, a Pre-Columbian civilization living in the tropical lowlands of south-central Mexico, calendar system required an advanced understanding of mathematics. The Olmec number system was based on 20 instead of decimal and used three symbols- a dot for one, a bar for five, and a shell-like symbol for zero. The concept of zero is one of the Olmecs' greatest achievements. It permitted numbers to be written by position and allowed for complex calculations. Although the invention of zero is often attributed to the Mayans, it was originally conceived by the Olmecs.

To predict planting and harvesting times, early peoples studied the movements of the sun, stars, and planets. They used this information to make calendars. The Aztecs created two calendars- one for farming, and one for religion. The farming calendar let them know when to plant and to harvest crops. An Aztec calendar stone dug up in Mexico City in 1790 includes information about the months of the year and pictures of the sun god at the center.

Colonial Era

After the Viceroyalty of New Spain was founded, the Spanish brought the scientific culture that dominated Spain to the Viceroyalty of New Spain.

The Franciscan order founded the first school of higher learning in the Americas, the Colegio de Santa Cruz de Tlatelolco in 1536, at the site of an Aztec school.

The municipal government (cabildo) of Mexico City formally requested the Spanish crown to establish a university in 1539. The Royal and Pontifical University of Mexico (Real y Pontificia Universidad de México) was established in 1551. The university was administered by the clergy and it was the official university of the empire. It provided quality education for the people, and it was a hub of intellectual and religious development in the region. It taught subjects such as physics and mathematics from the perspective of Aristotelian philosophy. Augustinian philosopher Alonso Gutiérrez in 1553 he became the first professor of the University of Mexico. He wrote Physical speculation, the first scientific text in the Americas, in 1557. By the late 18th century, the university had trained 1,162 doctors, 29,882 bachelors, and many lawyers. 

Pedro Lopez, a physician to King Philip II was sent to New Spain in order to write a medical history of the nation. He spent seven years on his work.  He made descriptions and drawings of Novhispanic flora and fauna, and experimented with Indigenous remedies. He returned to Spain with the results of his work in 1577. The book was bound and stored in the archives of the Escorial only to be mostly lost when fire afflicted the palace in 1671. An abridged version however was saved and was published by Federico Cesi. Back in Mexico a Dominican lay brother named Francisco Jiménez translated the abridgement from Latin to Spanish. It was composed of four books: the first three relating to plants, and the fourth relating to animals and minerals. 

Alonso López de Hinojosos, the physician at the Royal Hospital of Indians conducted many autopsies during the epidemic of 1576 in order to understand more the nature of the Cocoliztli disease. He also wrote textbooks on surgery. During that same epidemic, Juan de la Fuente, professor of Medicine at the University of Mexico convoked all of the local physicians in order to further understand the disease. 

Carlos de Sigüenza y Góngora was a Mexican Jesuit poet, a philosopher, a mathematician, a historian, and antiquarian. He studied astronomy, physics, and mathematics at Tepotzotlán College. He was at one point invited to visit the court of Louis XIV. He abandoned Aristotelianism and adopted Cartesianism. He also advocated a naturalistic explanation for comets, free from superstition. 

In 1693 Viceory Galve nominated Sigüenza to form part of a scientific expedition tasked with exploring the Gulf of Mexico. Siguena accepted and published his findings in a treatise. He also wrote treatises on astronomy and geometry.

Bourbon Reforms

In the early 18th century, the War of Spanish Succession ended with the rule of Spain passing over from the House of Habsburg over to the French House of Bourbon. The new ruling family inaugurated a program of government improvements known as the Bourbon Reforms which also affected the colonies and inaugurated the era of Spanish American Enlightenment. Regardless, the 1767 expulsion of Jesuits, who had been key in the fields of Mexican science and education, helped to antagonize the Creoles. In 1792 the Seminary of Mining was established. Later it became the College of Mining, in which the first modern physics laboratory in Mexico was established. Andrés Manuel del Río and Fausto Elhuyar arrived from Spain to join the faculty. It taught courses on topography, geodesy, mineralogy, and other sciences. Shortly before a botanical garden had also been established which also taught a course on botany. 

Notable scientists during this era included José Antonio de Alzate y Ramírez and Andrés Manuel del Río. Río discovered the chemical element vanadium in 1801.

During this era Francisco Xavier Gamboa was a jurist who also expressed interest in science. After being tasked with compiling reports for the government of New Spain he studied mathematics and mining and wrote a treatise on mining engineering. 

Antonio de León y Gama wrote reports on the moons of Jupiter, the climate of New Spain, and helped to precisely calculate the longitude of Mexico. He also wrote a report on the Aztec sun stone. 

Joaquín Velázquez de León's scientific reputation earned the praise of Alexander von Humboldt. He studied the works of Francis Bacon and Isaac Newton and specialized in mathematics, geodesy, and astronomy. 

Velázquez de León built scientific instruments not available in New Spain and accompanied José de Gálvez on his expedition to Sonora. He also made expeditions into the Californias where the clear skies of those regions allowed him to make many astronomical observations, including a transit of venus in 1769, which allowed him to measure the distance from the Earth to the sun. Accompanying him on that occasion was Jean-Baptiste Chappe d'Auteroche, the French priest and geometer. While in the Californias he precisely calculated their longitudes and latitudes. In 1773, he also precisely calculated the longitude and latitude of Mexico City. 

Through triangulation between Peñón de los Baños, to Huehuetoca, Velázquez de León drew up topographical charts for the region. He was also commissioned to work on projects related to mining by the government of New Spain. 

José Antonio de Alzate y Ramírez conducted many experiments, regarding electricity and meteorology. In 1789, he recorded observations regarding a rare occurrence of the aurora borealis in Mexico. He was also an avid naturalist, cataloging many Mexican plants and animals, and studying the migration patterns of birds. He however has also been criticized for not using the nascent Linnaean taxonomy. 

During the reign of Charles III, Alejandro Malaspina and Dionisio Alcalá Galiano and Antonio Valdés y Fernández Bazán were tasked with carrying out expeditions to explore the northwest coast of New Spain. 

José Mariano Mociño studied at the Botanic Garden in 1789. Mociño had accompanied Martín Sessé y Lacasta in the scientific expedition ordered by Charles IV in 1795 tasked with surveying New Spain’s plant life. The expedition lasted eight years. Mociño traveled over three thousand leagues ultimately producing a report titled Mexican Flora which was then sent to the Real Jardín Botánico de Madrid. The Swiss naturalist Augustin Pyramus de Candolle was an admirer of the work, and when Mociño travelled to Spain to access his volume, a copy had to be made so that DeCandolle would not have to part with it.

Early Years of Independence

In 1833, President Valentín Gómez Farías, himself a physician decreed the establishment of a School of Medical Sciences. It was ultimately not built due to the Gomez Farias administration being overthrown by a coup shortly afterward, but in 1854 a private medical college was established in Mexico City.  Gómez Farías also closed the Royal and Pontifical University of Mexico in 1833 as part of his anti-clerical measures. 

Certain Mexican presidents in this era had come from a background in the sciences. President Anastasio Bustamante had been a physician and during a temporary exile in Europe, he had spent some of his time visiting the anatomical collections of Montpellier and Vienna.  President Valentín Gómez Farías had started out his professional career practicing medicine in Guadalajara. President Manuel Robles Pezuela was a military engineer who had engaged in important geodesic and topographic projects in the Isthmus of Tehuantepec. He was also a member of the Mexican Society of Statistics and of the Paris Geographical Society.

The statesman Lucas Alamán who served under multiple administrations had come from a background of mining engineering, and in his youth he had studied in Europe under René Just Haüy, Jean-Baptiste Biot, and Louis Jacques Thénard.  He had also sought to bring to Mexico the technique of separating silver and gold through the use of sulfuric acid in contrast to the old technique of using nitric acid. 

General Pedro García Conde studied mathematics, chemistry, and minerology, at the Mining College in Mexico, and joined the military as an engineer. In 1834, he was named geometer of the boundary commision. In 1838 he was named director of the Military College. 

Conde passed sweeping reforms for the military college, establishing courses on descriptive geometry, applied mechanics, astronomy and geodesy. He was Secretary of War in the years leading up to the Mexican American War. He was tasked by a government commission to map the boundary established by the Treaty of Guadalupe Hidalgo, and made the effort to try to save as much territory as he could for Mexico. 

 Francisco Díaz Covarrubias studied at the Mining School, and in 1854 he was appointed professor of topography, geodesy, and astronomy.  He was part of the team that made the first detailed hydrographic map of the valley of Mexico, and improved upon the Mexican geographic coordinates made by Alexander von Humboldt.  

Leopoldo Río de la Loza studied at San Ildefonso College and in 1827 received the title of surgeon. He did not enjoy the field and began studying to work as a pharmacist. He graduated in 1833 and played a role in the efforts against the cholera epidemic which broke out that year. He published articles on mineral and drinking waters, on medication, on Lake Texcoco, and other matters related to public hygiene.  

Miguel F. Jiménez after attending medical school began teaching anatomy in 1838. He published an landmark study on spotted fever colloquially known as tabardillo, in 1846. He continued to publish various treatises on illnesses and conditions throughout his career.  

The first industrial exhibition in Mexico opened on November 1, 1849 in Mexico City.  In 1849, the exclusive concession to establish telegraph lines was granted to Juan de la Granja, and on December, 1851 the first telegram in Mexico was transmitted from Mexico City to Puebla. The line was extended to Vera Cruz the following year. 

During the period of the Second Mexican Empire, Emperor Maximilian organized an academy of science and literature.  Among its scientific faculty were Leopoldo Río de la Loza, Miguel F. Jiménez, head of the school of medicine, Joaquin de Mier y Teran professor of mathematics at the College of Mining, and the mining engineer Antonio del Castillo. 

Maximilian’s Minister of Public Works Luis Robles Pezuela presented the government a report on the state of Mexico’s telegraphic network which then included three lines. One connecting Veracruz to Tehuacán, and two private lines: one of them connecting Bagdad to Matamoros. Maximilian also had a private line built, connecting the Chapultepec Castle to the National Palace. The Emperor made efforts to expand this network. 

A railroad connecting Veracruz to Mexico City was first proposed in 1830. The government granted an ill fated concession to begin the project in 1837.  After more ill fated efforts substantial progress was finally made in 1857 after a concession had been granted to Antonio Escandon, but it was interrupted by the nation’s ongoing civil wars.  Engineers commisioned by Emperor Maximilian completed 134 miles before the fall of the Second Mexican Empire in 1867.  The long awaited Mexico City to Veracruz railroad line was finally inaugurated on January 1, 1873.

Porfiriato

Porfirio Díaz' ascension to the presidency in 1876 brought an end to the Mexican civil wars which had repeatedly broken out since independence had first been achieved. Mexico entered upon a period of stability and industrialization which also contributed to advances in science and technology. The influence of French Positivism led to a renaissance of scientific activity in Mexico.

Chief among the positivists was Gabino Barreda who founded the Escuela Nacional Preparatoria and became its first director. The medical faculty would eventually include the physicians Manuel Carmona y Valle, Eduardo Liceaga, and Rafael Lavista y Rebolla, the oculist Joaquín Vértiz, and the pediatrician Miguel Otero y Arce.  The faculty of physical scientists would eventually include the chemist Andrés Almaraz, and the engineer Mariano de la Bárcena.   The faculty of mathematics would eventually include Jose Joaquin Terrazas, and the engineer Leandro Fernández Imas.  

A national observatory at Chapultepec was decreed in December, 1876 and inaugurated on May, 1878. It's first director was Francisco Díaz Covarrubias. The observatory included a meteorological and magnetic observatory and maintained correspondence with international observatories and scientific organizations.  In 1877 a meteorological observatory was established which also maintained correspondance with international observatories.  Covarrubias was appointed president over a scientific commission tasked with travelling to Japan to observe the 1874 transit of Venus. A geological society was established in 1875.  

The Federal Telegraphic Office during this time provided meteorological observations.  The Academy of Medicine annually awarded prizes to the authors of the best scientific reports. A Pedro Escobedo Society also awarded prizes for scientific accomplishments. The Mexican government made efforts to reward scientific discovery by sending relevant scientists to Europe so that they could gain more attention for their work.  

The proliferation of railroads stimulated the development of Mexican industry by giving it access to the latest machinery.  

A Ministry of Communications and Public Works was established during this time, and began a program of building lighthouses for Mexican ports.  The Ministry also commissioned improvements to the Veracruz Harbor.  Smaller improvements were made to the Atlantic ports of Progreso, Campeche, and Tuxpam. The only Pacific ports to be improved during this time were Manzanillo and Salina Cruz.  

Improvements to the nation’s telegraph network continued during this time. A school of telegraphy was established along with workshops to repair the network.   Experiments were made in wireless telegraphy in order to bridge the Sea of Cortés.   By 1902, the network spanned over 40,000 kilometers of wire with 379 stations.  

A telephone network began to be built in Mexico during this time. By the beginning of the 20th century telephone networks between cities spanned over 27,000 kilometers of wire and included almost 3000 devices. Every state in Mexico was included in the network.  
 
General Manuel Mondragón invented the Mondragón rifle during this time. These designs include the straight-pull bolt-action M1893 and M1894 rifles, and Mexico's first self-loading rifle, the M1908 - the first of the designs to see combat use.

Science and technology in the 20th century

During the 20th century, Mexico made significant progress in science and technology. New universities and research institutes were established. The National Autonomous University of Mexico (Universidad Nacional Autónoma de México, UNAM) was officially established in 1910, and the university become one of the most important institutes of higher learning in Mexico. UNAM provides education in science, medicine, and engineering. Many scientific institutes and new institutes of higher learning, such as National Polytechnic Institute (founded in 1936), were established during the first half of the 20th century. Most of the new research institutes were created within UNAM. Twelve institutes were integrated into UNAM from 1929 to 1973.

Mexican scientists, physicians, and intellectuals were involved in the movement to shape Mexico's population through eugenics.  The Sociedad Mexicana de Eugenesia was founded in 1931, and was concerned with mental disabilities, prison reform, tuberculosis, syphilis, alcoholism, sexual education, mestizaje, prostitution, puericulture, (scientific child-rearing), and single mothers. The society advocated for maternal assistance, eradication of juvenile delinquency, and incorporation of its ideas into the functioning of schools, prisons, and public health administration. It succeeding in having established a medical clinic, the Hereditary Health Counseling Center, for workers. The organization published the journal Eugenesia until 1954.

In the 1930s Manuel Sandoval Vallartaa Mexican physicist worked on Cosmic ray research and in 1943 to 1946, he divided his time between MIT and UNAM as a full-time professor.

On August 31, 1946, Guillermo González Camarena sent his first color transmission from his lab in the offices of The Mexican League of Radio Experiments, at Lucerna St. #1, in Mexico City. The video signal was transmitted at a frequency of 115  MHz. and the audio in the 40-meter band. González Camarena was a Mexican engineer who was the inventor of a color-wheel type of color television, and who also introduced color television to Mexico.

Mexico was in the forefront of the Green Revolution, funded by the Rockefeller Foundation and developed by Norman Borlaug, who later won the Nobel Prize for his work.  The aim was to increase the productivity of Mexican agriculture through the development of new strains of seeds.  Mexico founded the International Maize and Wheat Improvement Center to further this scientific work.

In the 1950s, the wild yam known as  barbasco was discovered to contain steroid hormones that could affect human fertility and led to the development of The Pill. A Mexican research company, Syntex was founded and began producing oral contraceptives. The Mexican government under President Luis Echeverría created a state-run company, Proquivemex, to control and regulate the industry.

In 1959, the Mexican Academy of Sciences (Academia Mexicana de Ciencias) was established as a non-governmental, non-profit organization of distinguished scientists. The Academy has grown in membership and influence, and it represents a strong voice of scientists from different fields, mainly in science policy.

By 1960, science was institutionalized in Mexico. It was viewed as a legitimate endeavor by the Mexican society. Guillermo Haro through his own astronomical research and the formation of new institutions, Haro was influential in the development of modern observational astronomy in Mexico. Internationally, he is best known for his contribution to the discovery of Herbig–Haro objects.

In 1961, the Center for Research and Advanced Studies of the National Polytechnic Institute was established as a center for graduate studies in subjects such as biology, mathematics, and physics. In 1961, the institute began its graduate programs in physics and mathematics and schools of science were established in Mexican states of Puebla, San Luis Potosí, Monterrey, Veracruz, and Michoacán. The Academy for Scientific Research was established in 1968 and the National Council of Science and Technology was established in 1971.

Ricardo Miledi, one of the ten most quoted neuro-biologists of all time, was born in Mexico, D.F. in 1927. His career in science began in 1955 when, just before graduating in Medicine at the Universidad Nacional Autónoma de Mexico (UNAM), he joined one of the most active research groups in his country, part of the Instituto Nacional de Cardiología (the National Institute of Cardiology).

Many of Professor Miledi's studies and breakthroughs in Neurobiology, especially those related to the mechanisms of synaptic and neuromuscular transmission, are considered to be classic throughout the world. Over 450 publications are the tangible product of forty years of research devoted to the main to the primary functions of the nervous system: the transmission of information between cells. He has been a member of the Royal Society of London since 1980 and entered the American Academy of Arts and Sciences in 1986. In 1999 Miledi was awarded the Prince of Asturias Award for Technical and Scientific Research. 
He has been Professor of Biophysics at the University of London and distinguished professor of the University of California since 1984. He also leads a neurobiology laboratory in UNAM in Querétaro, México.

In 1985 Rodolfo Neri Vela became the first Mexican citizen to enter space as part of the STS-61-B mission.

In 1995 Mexican chemist Mario J. Molina shared the Nobel Prize in Chemistry with Paul J. Crutzen, and F. Sherwood Rowland for their work in atmospheric chemistry, particularly concerning the formation and decomposition of ozone. Molina, an alumnus of UNAM, became the first Mexican citizen to win the Nobel Prize in science.

Evangelina Villegas work with maize led to the development of quality protein maize (QPM). Surinder Vasal, shared the 2000 World Food Prize for this achievement. Villegas was the first woman to ever receive the World Food Prize.

The Large Millimeter Telescope was inaugurated on 22 November 2006. It is the world's largest and most sensitive single-aperture telescope in its frequency range, built for observing radio waves in the wavelengths from approximately 0.85 to 4  mm. Located on top of the Sierra Negra. It is a binational Mexican (70%) - American (30%) joint project.

In 1962, the National Commission of Outer Space (Comisión Nacional del Espacio Exterior, CONNE) was established but was dismantled in 1977. On July 30, 2010, the law to create the Agencia Espacial Mexicana (AEM) was published. It is now in the process of defining the National Space Policy and its program of activities.
Robotics is a new area under development in Mexico, the Mexone Robot is one of the most advanced robot designs in the world.

Science and technology in the 21st century

Austrade predicts Mexico's IT spending will grow at a compound annual growth rate of 11 percent over 2011–2015.

Based on the information managed by Scopus, a bibliographic database for science, the Spanish web portal SCImago places Mexico at 28th in-country scientific ranking with 82,792 publications, and 34th considering its value of 134 for the h-index. Both positions are computed for the period 1996–2007.

The electronics industry of Mexico has grown enormously within the last decade. In 2007 Mexico surpassed South Korea as the second-largest manufacturer of televisions, and in 2008 Mexico surpassed China, South Korea, and Taiwan to become the largest producer of smartphones in the world. There are almost half a million (451,000) students enrolled in electronics engineering programs.

José Hernández-Rebollar he invented an electronic glove, known as the AcceleGlove, which translates hand movements from the American Sign Language into spoken and written words. His invention already recognizes and translates 300 basic words. His invention has been recognized by the Smithsonian Institution, where he has lectured about the glove, which has attracted media attention.

Mission Colmena (hive) is to find a technology niche for Mexico in the space sector for the future. In which Mexico can participate together with an international consortia either in scientific exploration or in economic exploitation inner solar system bodies moons or asteroids and in particular objects that do not have their surfaces exposed to the interplanetary medium. The hives mission intends to use a complex systems of properties, the fact that each of the small robots will have the ability to autonomously navigate to get to join with as many units as possible and eventually connect electrically.

Overview of science and technology policy, 2015–2019

A shift in development model 
Since the change in government in December 2018, Mexico’s socio-economic policy has pivoted towards a new development model with a focus on social programmes. The government has introduced new instruments to redistribute income. This has contributed to a change in the structure of public expenditure, both in terms of consumption and investment.

Mexico has been affected by the America First doctrine of its northern neighbour and main trading partner, which materialized in a long negotiation for the signing of the USMCA. As a result, Mexico has departed from its previous growth pattern of around 2% per year. In 2019, the economy shrank by 0.1%, although full employment was preserved, with just 3.4% of the population being unemployed at the time.

A focus on social and local challenges 

There is, as yet, little evidence that Mexico’s economy will undergo deep structural changes overnight. The absence of any industrial policy suggests that the Mexican economy will remain dependent on oil and manufactured exports associated with global value chains, as well as remittances. Mexico’s main targets, as outlined in the National Development Plan for 2019–2024, relate to national challenges such as poverty, inequality, employment and education. Mexico submitted a Voluntary National Review for the Highlevel Political Forum on Sustainable Development in 2018 and the current government has linked the National Development Plan to The 2030 Agenda for Sustainable Development. The government is working to connect science better with local challenges. Its new initiative, entitled Strategic National Programmes (PRONACES), allocates funding to research projects with a focus on societal issues at local level. 

Programmes include: contaminating processes and the socioenvironmental impact of toxins; the promotion of literacy as a strategy for social inclusion; and the sustainability of socioecological systems.

PRONACES is co-ordinated by the National Council of Science and Technology (CONACYT). In 2019, PRONACES accounted for just 1.1% of CONACYT’s budget but recent changes suggest that resources may be reassigned to this new programme. Since 2019, the government has reverted to a linear view of innovation that minimizes the vital role played by the business sector in innovation. One consequence of this policy shift has been that CONACYT no longer funds private business ventures, although it does still engage in other forms of public–private partnership like with the Querétaro Aerospace Cluster.

The end of the road for sectoral funds 

Since 2019, the government has been gradually winding down the sectoral funds programme, as part of the curb on allocating resources to promote business innovation. In 2019 and 2020, CONACYT did not issue any calls for project proposals, meaning that only those projects having received funding in previous years remain operational.

The Law on Science and Technology (2002) stipulates that CONACYT is entitled to sign agreements with various ministries and other government bodies to cofinance each sectoral fund. Technical committees were set up to assign public resources to priority economic sectors. By 2005, there were 17 of these mission-oriented funds in sectors that included agriculture, energy, environment and health. 

The amount of resources allocated to the sectoral funds has always been modest; by 2019, these amounted to 2.1% of CONACYT’s budget.

In 2020, the government decided to eliminate sectoral funds altogether without undertaking any robust evaluation to justify their disappearance.

Putting the brakes on the slide in research intensity 
Research intensity has been declining steadily. In 2018, it hit a low of 0.31% of GDP. In 2020, parliament approved a rule prohibiting any further drop in public research expenditure until the 1% target laid out in the Law of Science and Technology is attained. 

In 2018, the public sector financed nearly 80% of GERD. To promote basic science, the López Obrador administration has established a new programme called Frontier Science that is co-ordinated by CONACYT.

A far-reaching bill 
A draft bill on science, technology and innovation was presented to the president in December. The bill proposes moving from a governance system in which the scientific, technical, academic and business communities at federal and state levels all participate in decision-making bodies towards a concentration of power in CONACYT. Some other normative documents already approved by parliament reflect this gradual centralization of decision-making power and resources in CONACYT. For instance, the new CONACYT Statutes approved in 2020 have eliminated the autonomous character of the body responsible for ensuring linkages between the public sector and the scientific, technical, academic and business communities, the Scientific and Technological Consultative Forum.

Chicxulub crater

The Chicxulub crater is an impact crater buried underneath the Yucatán Peninsula in Mexico. The crater was discovered by Antonio Camargo and Glen Penfield, geophysicists who had been looking for petroleum in the Yucatán during the late 1970s. The Alvarez hypothesis posits that the mass extinction of the dinosaurs and many other living things during the Cretaceous–Paleogene extinction event was caused by the impact of a large asteroid on the Earth.  Evidence indicates that the asteroid fell in the Yucatán Peninsula, at Chicxulub, Mexico. The hypothesis is named after the father-and-son team of scientists Luis and Walter Alvarez, who first suggested it in 1980.

Mexican National Prize for Arts and Sciences

Physics, Mathematics, and Natural Sciences
Ciencias Físico-Matemáticas y Naturales

2018: (Tie)
Carlos Alberto Aguilar Salinas
Mónica Alicia Clapp Jiménez Labora
2017: María Elena Álvarez-Buylla Roces
2016: (Tie)
Cecilia Noguez
David Kershenobich Stalnikowitz
2015: (Tie)
Jorge Alcocer Varela
Fernando del Río Haza
2014: (Tie)
Carlos Federico Arias Ortiz
Mauricio Hernández Ávila
2013: (Tie)
Federico Bermúdez Rattoni
Magdaleno Medina Noyola
2012: (Tie)
Ruben Gerardo Barrera
Carlos Artemio Coello Coello
Susana Lizano
2011:Julio Collado-Vides
2010: (Tie)
Marcelo Lozada y Cassou
Gerardo Gamba Ayala
2009: (Tie)
Alberto Darszon Israel
Jaime Urrutia Fucugauchi
2008: (Tie)
Edmundo García Moya
Alberto Robledo Nieto
Moisés Selman
2007: Silvia Torres Castilleja
2006: Juan Ramón de la Fuente
1986: Adolfo Martínez Palomo
1985: Marcos Rojkind Matluk
1984: José Ruiz Herrera
1983: Octavio Augusto Novaro
1982: Bernardo Sepúlveda Gutiérrez
1981: Manuel Peimbert Sierra
1980: Guillermo Soberón Acevedo
1979: Pablo Rudomín Zevnovaty
1978: Rafael Méndez Martínez
1977: Jorge Cerbón Solórzano
1976: (Tie)
 Ismael Herrera Revilla
 Julían Adem Chahín
 Samuel Gitler Hammer
1975:(Tie)
 Arcadio Poveda Ricalde
 Guillermo Massieu Helguera
 Joaquín Gravioto Muñoz
1974: (Tie)
 Emilio Rosenblueth Deutsch
 Ruy Pérez Tamayo
1973: Carlos Casas Campillo
1972: (Tie)
 Antonio González Ochoa
 Isaac Costero Tudanca
 Luis Sánchez Medal
1971: Jesús Romo Armería
1970: Carlos Graef Fernández
1969: (Tie)
 Fernando de Alba Andrade
 Ignacio Bernal
1968: Salvador Zubirán Anchondo
1967: José Adem Chaín
1966: Arturo Rosenblueth Stearns
1964: Ignacio González Guzmán
1963: Guillermo Haro Barraza
1961: Ignacio Chávez Sánchez
1959: Manuel Sandoval Vallarta
1957: Nabor Carrillo Flores
1948: Maximiliano Ruiz Castañeda

Technology and Design

Tecnología y Diseño

2018: (Tie)
Ricardo Chicurel Uziel
Leticia Myriam Torres Guerra
2017:Emilio Sacristan Rock
2016: (Tie)
Lourival Possani Postay
Luis Enrique Sucar Succar
2015:
Raúl Rojas
Enrique Galindo Fentanes
2014: José Mauricio López Romero
2013: Martín Ramón Aluja Schuneman Hofer
2012: Sergio Antonio Estrada Parra
2011: Raúl Gerardo Quintero Flores
2010: Sergio Revah Moiseev
2009: (Tie)
Blanca Elena Jiménez Cisneros
José Luis Leyva Montiel
2008: María de los Ángeles Valdés
2007: Miguel Pedro Romo Organista
2006: Fernando Samaniego Verduzco
2005: Alejandro Alagón Cano
2004: (Tie)
Héctor Mario Gómez Galvarriata
Martín Guillermo Hernández Luna
Arturo Menchaca
2003: Octavio Manero Brito
2002: Alexander Balankin
2001: Filberto Vázquez Dávila
2000: Francisco Alfonso Larque Saavedra
1999: Jesús Gonzales Hernández 
1997: (Tie)
 Baltasar Mena Iniesta
 Feliciano Sánchez Silencio
1996: (Tie)
 Adolfo Guzmán Arenas
 María Luisa Ortega Delgado
1995: Alfredo Sánchez Marroquín
1994: (Tie)
 Francisco Sánchez Sesma 
 Juan Vázquez Lomberta
1993: José Ricardo Gómez Romero
1992: (Tie)
 Lorenzo Martínez Gómez 
 Gabriel Torres Villaseñor
1991: (Tie)
 Octavio Paredes López
 Roberto Meli Piralla
1990: (Tie)
 Daniel Reséndiz Núñez
 Juan Milton Garduño
1988: Mayra de la Torre 
1987: Enrique Hong Chong
1986: Daniel Malacara Hernández
1985: José Luis Sánchez Bribiesca
1984: Jorge Suárez Díaz
1983: José Antonio Ruiz de la Herrán Villagómez
1982: Raúl J. Marsal Córdoba
1981: Luis Esteva Maraboto
1980: Marcos Mazari Menzer
1979: Juan Celada Salmón
1978: Enrique del Moral
1977: Francisco Rafael del Valle Canseco
1976: (Tie)
 Reinaldo Pérez Rayón
 Wenceslao X. López Martín del Campo

Mexican-born scientists working in the United States

Héctor García-Molina a Mexican-American computer scientist and Professor in the Departments of Computer Science and Electrical Engineering at Stanford University was advisor to Sergey Brin, the co-founder of Google, from 1993 to 1997 when he was a computer science student at Stanford. In March 2015, Mexican-born engineer Luis Velasco, who works at NASA, designs and engineers robots for the company. He obtained a scholarship at Brigham Young University in Provo, Utah and studied mechanical engineering. Details of a mousepad designed by Armando M. Fernandez were published in the Xerox Disclosure Journal in 1979.

In February 2015, SpaceX began developing a space suit for astronauts to wear within the Dragon 2 space capsule. Its appearance was jointly designed by Jose Fernandez—a Mexican Hollywood costume designer known for his works for superhero and science fiction films—and SpaceX founder and CEO Elon Musk. According to SpaceX, the spacesuit has key features such as a 3D printed Space suit helmet, touchscreen-compatible gloves, flame resistant outer layer, and hearing protection during ascent and reentry. Furthermore, each suit “can provide a pressurized environment for all crew members aboard Dragon in atypical situations. This suit also routes communications and cooling systems to the astronauts aboard Dragon during regular flight.”

The Space For Humanity initiative selected Katya Echazarreta out of over 7,000 applicants to fly to space with Blue Origin NS-21 as a Space for Humanity Ambassador. Launched on June 4, 2022, she became the first Mexican-born woman in space.

 Alvarez - Gonzalez Rafael - (molecular biologist)
 Albert Vinicio Bae - (physicist, Science educator)
 Rodrigo Banuelos - (mathematician)
 Barona, Andres, Jr. - (educational psychologist)
 Diaz, Fernando G. - (neurosurgeon)
 Garcia, Hector P. - (physician, activist)
 Garcia - Luna - Aceves J.J. (electrical engineer, inventor)
 Arturo Gómez-Pompa (botanist)
 Gonzalez, Elma (cell biologist)

Premio México de Ciencia y Tecnología
Premio México de Ciencia y Tecnología is an award bestowed in by the CONACYT to Ibero-American (Latin America plus the Iberian Peninsula) scholars in recognition of advances in science and/or technology.

See also

 History of Mexico
 Index of Mexico-related articles
 Spanish American Enlightenment
 Spanish language in science and technology
CONACYT

Sources 
This article incorporates text from a free content work. Licensed under CC BY-SA 3.0 IGO Text taken from Latin America. In: UNESCO Science Report: the Race Against Time for Smarter Development, Gabriela Dutrénit, Carlos Aguirre-Bastos, Martín Puchet and Mónica Salazar, UNESCO. To learn how to add open license text to Wikipedia articles, please see this how-to page. For information on reusing text from Wikipedia, please see the terms of use.

References

Further reading

Agostini, Claudia. Monuments of Progress: Modernization and Public Health in Mexico City, 1876–1910.University of Calgary Press and University Press of Colorado 2003.
Beatty, Edward. Technology and the Search for Progress in Mexico. Berkeley: University of California Press 2015.
Boyer, Christopher R., ed. A Land Between Waters: Environmental Histories of Modern Mexico. Tucson: University of Arizona Press 2012.
Cotter, Joseph. Troubled Harvest: Agronomy and Revolution in Mexico, 1880-2002. Westport CT: Praeger 2003.
Fishburn, Evelyn and Eduardo L. Ortiz, eds., Science and the Creative Imagination in Latin America. London: Institute for the Study of the Americas 2005.
Fortes, Jacqueline; Larissa Adler Lomnitz. Becoming A Scientist In Mexico. Penn State University Press 1990. 
Hewitt de Alcántara, Cynthia. Modernizing Mexican Agriculture: Socioeconomic Implications of Technological Change, 19401970. Geneva: UN Research Institute for Social Development 1976.
Levy, Daniel C. (1986). Higher Education and the State in Latin America: Private Challenges to Public Dominance. University of Chicago Press. .
Medina Eden, et al., eds. Beyond Imported Magic: Essays on Science, Technology, and Society in Latin America. Cambridge MA: MIT Press 2014.
Simonian, Lane. Defending the Land of the Jaguar: A History of Conservationism in Mexico. Austin: University of Texas Press 1995.
Saldaña, Juan José. Science in Latin America: A History. Austin: University of Texas Press 2006.
Soto Laveaga, Gabriela. Jungle Laboratories: Mexican Peasants, National Projects, and the Making of The Pill. Durham: Duke University Press, 2009.
Soto Laveaga, Gabriela. "Bringing the Revolution to Medical Schools: Social Service and a Rural Health Emphasis in 1930s Mexico." Mexican Studies/Estudios Mexicanos 29, no. 2 (2013): 397–427.
Trabulse, Elías (1983). Historia de la ciencia en México: Estudios y textos. Siglo XIX. Fondo de Cultura Económica. .
Trabulse, Elías (1983). Historia de la ciencia en México (versión abreviada). Fondo de Cultura Económica.
Trabulse, Elías (1983–1989). Historia de la ciencia en México (5 vol.). Fondo de Cultura Económica.
Trabulse, Elías (1992). José María Velasco: Un pasaje de la ciencia en México. Instituto Mexiquense de Cultura.
Trabulse, Elías (1993). Ciencia mexicana: Estudios históricos. Textos Dispersos.
Trabulse, Elías (1994). Los orígenes de la ciencia moderna en México. Fondo de Cultura Económica.
Trabulse, Elías (1995). Arte y ciencia en la historia de México. Fomento Cultural Banamex.
Wolfe, Mikael D. Watering the Revolution: An Environmental and Technological History of Agrarian Reform in Mexico. Durham: Duke University Press 2017.

External links
SCImago: Scientometrics Research Group.
https://www.conacyt.gob.mx/
http://cienciamx.com/index.php
 Newton en la ciencia novohispana  https://docs.wixstatic.com/ugd/a05c53_332cf2552e0940a088279d77de1b81db.pdf